The Return of Superman may refer to:

 The Return of Superman (TV series), a South Korean TV series
 The Return of Superman, a DC Comics title

See also
 Superman Returns (disambiguation)